Darrell Scott is an American musician.

Darrell Scott may also refer to:
Darrell Scott, founder of Rachel's Challenge
Darrell Scott (American football) (born 1989), American football player
Darryl Scott (cricketer) (born 1961), Australian cricketer
Da'Rel Scott (born 1988), American football player
Darryl Scott (born 1968), baseball pitcher
Darrell C. Scott, American pastor and a member of President Donald Trump's executive transition team 
Darryl M. Scott, member of the Delaware House of Representatives